Sonia Huguet (born 13 September 1975 in Saint-Avold) is a French racing cyclist who represented France at the 2004 Summer Olympics. She was a professional rider between 1994 and 2005.

Palmarès

1993
1st Stage 3, Ronde van de Tarn-et-Garonne

1994
2nd Pursuit, French National Track Championships

1996
1st Points race, French National Track Championships
1st French National Time Trial Championships

2001
2nd French National Road Race Championships
6th French National Time Trial Championships

2002
2nd Pursuit, French National Track Championships
7th French National Time Trial Championships

2003
1st French National Road Race Championships
3rd French National Time Trial Championships

2004
1st La Flèche Wallonne Féminine
3rd French National Time Trial Championships
4th French National Road Race Championships

2005
6th French National Road Race Championships
7th French National Time Trial Championships

References

External links
An interview with Sonia Huguet, 9 May 2004

1975 births
Living people
People from Saint-Avold
French female cyclists
Cyclists at the 2004 Summer Olympics
Olympic cyclists of France
Sportspeople from Moselle (department)
Cyclists from Grand Est